Wak Wak is a locality in the Northern Territory of Australia located about  east of the territory capital of Darwin.

The locality is named for the local Aboriginal word for 'crow'.

The 2016 Australian census which was conducted in August 2016 reports that Wak Wak had no people living within its boundaries.

Wak Wak is located within the federal division of Lingiari, the territory electoral division of Nelson and the local government area of the Litchfield Municipality.

References

Suburbs of Darwin, Northern Territory